Andrew Rock (born January 23, 1982) is an American sprinter who specializes in the 400 meter dash.

Early career
Rock was born in Marshfield, Wisconsin, and grew up in Stratford, Wisconsin, where he graduated from high school in 2000. His high school career concluded at the 2000 Wisconsin State Championships, where he became the first athlete in meet history to win four individual titles at the same championships by winning the 110 m hurdles, 300 m hurdles, 200 m dash, and long jump. Despite this success, he was not a heavily recruited athlete.

Rock attended the University of Wisconsin–La Crosse, where he was a nine-time National Champion and a 17-time All-American. After finishing runner-up seven times between the 2001 and 2002 seasons, Rock hit his stride in 2003 and 2004, winning eight consecutive titles in the 400 m dash and  relay. Rock holds nine UW–LaCrosse records (four individual; five relays) and six WIAC records (three individual; three relays) and was twice named first-team Academic All-American by CoSIDA. In addition to these achievements, Rock also claimed the fastest 400 m time in Division III history, running a 44.66 at a USATF meet in Carson, California, thereby announcing his arrival onto the elite track scene. Rock turned professional soon after graduating from UW–La Crosse with a finance degree by signing a multi-year contract with Adidas.

As of 2017, Rock is head coach of the track and field teams at Bethel University.

Professional career

Rock finished 6th in the 400 m at the 2004 Olympic Trials, earning him a spot in the relay pool for the Olympic Games in Athens, Greece. In the 2004 Olympic Games, he ran for the American  relay team in the qualifying heats, securing the team a place in the final. The relay took first in the final, securing Rock a gold medal. In the 2005 World Championships in Helsinki, he competed in 400m and won a silver medal, setting a new personal best of 44.35. Later in the meet, he led off the  relay team to a World Championship gold medal. Rock followed his 2005 season with a 2006 campaign highlighted by his 400 m win at the AT&T USA Outdoor Championships in Indianapolis.

Personal bests

Career highlights

 2001-2004: 9-time NCAA Division III Champion, 17-time NCAA Division III All-American
 2004: Olympic 4x400m relay gold medalist, ranked #7 in the United States
 2005: World Outdoor 400m silver medalist, World Outdoor 4x400m gold medalist, ranked #2 in the United States and #3 in the World
 2006: USATF Outdoor Champion, 400 m, ranked #3 in the United States and #4 in the World
 2007: ranked #7 in the United States

Coaching career 

 2010-2012: Carleton College (Assistant Cross Country and Track Coach)
 Coached five conference champion sprinters/middle distance runners
 Carleton 800m runners set two new school records
 2012-present: Bethel University (Head Men's & Women's Track & Field Coach)
 2015: Named the Women's Indoor MIAC Coach of the Year
 2016: Karl Olsen earned men's outdoor MIAC Elite 22 award
 2017: Named the Men's Indoor MIAC Coach of the Year
 2017: Men's 4x400-meter relay finished runner-up at NCAA national outdoor meet
 2017: Bethel men finished third at and MIAC Indoor meet—tied for highest finish in program history
 2017: Coached 10 All-Americans
 2018: Bethel men finished third at and MIAC Indoor meet—tied for highest finish in program history
 2018: Karl Olsen finished as the 400m runner-up at NCAA national indoor meet
 2018: Karl Olsen voted Academic All-American
 2018: Annika Halverson voted Academic All-American
 2018: Women's 4x400-meter relay recorded back-to-back Indoor & Outdoor All-American finishes
 2018: Coached 19 All-Americans
 2019: Women's 4x400-meter relay recorded back-to-back Indoor & Outdoor All-American finishes
 2019: Karl Olsen awarded NCAA Post Graduate Scholarship
 2019: Carl Klamm runner-up in 400m at NCAA national outdoor meet
 2019: Coached 18 All-Americans
 2020: Coached 10 All-Americans
 2021: Bethel women finished second at MIAC Outdoor meet—highest finish in program history
 2021: Coached 3 All-Americans
 2021: Joel Smith runner-up in 400m Hurdles at NCAA national outdoor meet
 Coached 82 National Meet Qualifiers and 64 All-Americans, 149 MIAC Champions and 329 MIAC All-Conference winners
 47 school records broken since Coach Rock's tenure began in 2013

References

External links
 
 Wisconsin Track & Field Bio
 Andrew Rock Bio

1982 births
Living people
American male sprinters
Athletes (track and field) at the 2004 Summer Olympics
Sportspeople from La Crosse, Wisconsin
Track and field athletes from Wisconsin
University of Wisconsin–La Crosse alumni
Olympic gold medalists for the United States in track and field
People from Marshfield, Wisconsin
World Athletics Championships medalists
Medalists at the 2004 Summer Olympics
People from Stratford, Wisconsin
World Athletics Championships winners